Kevin Mason (born September 25, 1972) is a former American football quarterback who played four seasons in the Canadian Football League with the Saskatchewan Roughriders, Winnipeg Blue Bombers, and Edmonton Eskimos. He played college football at Syracuse University and attended West Seneca East Senior High School in West Seneca, New York. He was also a member of the Oakland Raiders, Montreal Alouettes, Buffalo Destroyers, Philadelphia Soul, Canton Legends and Erie RiverRats.

Professional career

Oakland Raiders
Mason signed with the Oakland Raiders after going undrafted in the 1995 NFL Draft. He was released by the Raiders on August 22, 1995.

Saskatchewan Roughriders
Mason signed with the Saskatchewan Roughriders in February 1996. He was released by the Roughriders in June 1998.

Winnipeg Blue Bombers
Mason was signed by the Winnipeg Blue Bombers on July 11, 1998 and released by the team on September 8, 1998.

Montreal Alouettes
Mason signed with the Montreal Alouettes on October 15, 1998. He spent the rest of the 1998 season on the Alouettes' practice roster. He was released by the Alouettes in April 1999.

Edmonton Eskimos
Mason was signed by the Edmonton Eskimos on September 2, 1999. He was released by the Eskimos on November 20, 1999.

Buffalo Destroyers
Mason played five seasons with the Buffalo Destroyers from 1999 to 2003. He played quarterback in addition to wide receiver and linebacker.

Philadelphia Soul
Mason signed with the Philadelphia Soul on December 9, 2003. He was released by the Soul on January 24, 2004.

Canton Legends
Mason played for the Canton Legends from 2005 to 2008, winning the American Indoor Football League championship in 2006.

Erie RiverRats
Mason signed with the Erie RiverRats in May 2009.

References

External links
 Just Sports Stats
 College stats
 Fanbase profile

Living people
1972 births
American football quarterbacks
American football wide receivers
Canadian football quarterbacks
Buffalo Destroyers players
Canton Legends players
Erie RiverRats players
Edmonton Elks players
Saskatchewan Roughriders players
Syracuse Orange football players
Winnipeg Blue Bombers players
Sportspeople from Buffalo, New York
Players of American football from Buffalo, New York
African-American players of American football
African-American players of Canadian football
21st-century African-American sportspeople
20th-century African-American sportspeople